Stanford Cardinal basketball may refer to:

Stanford Cardinal men's basketball
Stanford Cardinal women's basketball